Mosteiro de São Bento (in English: St Benedict's Monastery) is a church located in São Paulo, Brazil. Established on 14 July 1598, the current church was built between 1910 and 1914.

References

External links

Official website (in Portuguese)

Roman Catholic churches in São Paulo
1598 establishments in South America
Churches completed in 1914
Tourist attractions in São Paulo